Seymour Posner (May 21, 1925 – November 1, 1988) was an American politician who served in the New York State Assembly from 1965 to 1978.

He died of a heart attack on November 1, 1988, in Brooklyn, New York City, New York at age 63.

References

1925 births
1988 deaths
Democratic Party members of the New York State Assembly
Politicians from the Bronx
20th-century American politicians